The Dutch municipality Dalfsen is divided into districts and neighbourhoods for statistical purposes. The municipality is divided into the following statistical districts:

District 00 Dalfsen (kern) (CBS-neighbourhood code:014800)
District 01 Dalfsen - buitengebied (CBS-neighbourhood code:014801)
District 02 Oudleusen (CBS-neighbourhood code:014802)
District 03 Hoonhorst (CBS-neighbourhood code:014803)
District 04 Lenthe-2 (CBS-neighbourhood code:014804)
District 05 Kluinhaar (CBS-neighbourhood code:014805)
District 06 Lemelerveld (CBS-neighbourhood code:014806)
District 07 Leusenerveld (CBS-neighbourhood code:014807)

A statistical district may consist of several neighbourhoods. The table below shows the neighbourhood division with characteristic values according to the Statistics Netherlands (CBS, 2008):

|}

References

Dalfsen
Lists of neighborhoods in Dutch municipalities